Donald Rex Scott (born 5 November 1929) was an Australian rules footballer who played with South Melbourne in the Victorian Football League (VFL) during the early 1950s.

Scott played mostly as a ruckman or in defence over the course of his career, which began in 1948 at West Perth. In his first season, he was selected in the Western Australian interstate team and took part in two victories over Victoria.

His VFL stint lasted five seasons, with South Melbourne failing to make the finals in each. He returned to West Perth as captain-coach in 1955 and the following year crossed to Swan Districts where he had the same role.

He joined Waverley as their inaugural captain-coach when they joined the VFA for the 1961 competition and kicked 57 goals in his first season.

External links
 
 
 Donald Rex (Don) Scott, at WAFL Footy Facts
 Donald Rex Scott, at The VFA Project

1929 births
Australian rules footballers from Western Australia
West Perth Football Club players
Sydney Swans players
Swan Districts Football Club players
Waverley Football Club players
West Perth Football Club coaches
Swan Districts Football Club coaches
Living people